The Harper Lee Award for Alabama's Distinguished Writer of the Year is an annual award recognizing a writer who was born in Alabama or has spent their formative years there. It is named after Harper Lee, whose To Kill A Mockingbird has sold over 30 million copies.

The Harper Lee Award was established in 1998 and was awarded to Albert Murray.

Recipients 
 1998 - Albert Murray
 1999 - Madison Jones
 2000 - Helen Norris
 2001 - Sena Jeter Naslund
 2002 - Mary Ward Brown
 2003 - Rodney Jones
 2004 - Sonia Sanchez
 2005 - Andrew Highway
 2006 - Wayne Greenhaw
 2007 - William Cobb
 2008 - Rebecca Gilman
 2009 - Rick Bragg
 2010 - Carolyn Haines
 2011 - Winston Groom
 2012 - Fannie Flagg
 2013 - Gay Talese
 2014 - Mark Childress
 2015 - Hank Lazer
 2016 - E. O. Wilson
 2017 - Brad Watson
 2018 - Honorée Fanonne Jeffers
 2019 - Daniel Wallace
 2020 - Patti Callahan Henry
 2021 - Angela Johnson

References

American literary awards
Alabama literature
1998 establishments in Alabama
Awards established in 1998
To Kill a Mockingbird